Screen Memory is the first and only studio album by Australian new wave band MEO 245. The album peaked at No. 69 on the Kent Music Report Albums Chart. It was produced by Peter Dawkins (Air Supply, Dragon, Mi-Sex), with Dave Marett as audio engineer, at Studios 301, Sydney. According to Australian musicologist, Ian McFarlane, "[the] title was taken from A Critical Dictionary of Psychoanalysis and the record itself was full of English-influenced pop rock." The album provided two singles, "Other Places" (July 1981) and "Jewels (For Your Love)" (October). For Screen Memory MEO 245's line-up was Paul Brickhill on keyboards and vocals; Mark Kellett on bass guitar; Campbell Laird on drum kit; and Paul Northam on vocals and guitar.

Track listing

Credits 

 Paul Brickhill – keyboards, vocals
 Campbell Laird – drums
 Mark Kellett – bass guitar
 Paul Northam – guitar, vocals

Charts

References 

1981 debut albums
Mushroom Records albums
MEO 245 albums